Giovanni Battista Carrone (1641–1706) was a Roman Catholic prelate who served as Bishop of Strongoli (1692–1706).

Biography
Giovanni Battista Carrone was born on 11 December 1641 in San Guido d'Ostuni, Italy.
On 19 Dec 1691, he was appointed during the papacy of Pope Innocent XII as Bishop of Strongoli.
On 13 Jan 1692, he was consecrated bishop by Galeazzo Marescotti, Cardinal-Priest of Santi Quirico e Giulitta, with Giuseppe Bologna, Archbishop of Capua, and Stefano Giuseppe Menatti, Titular Bishop of Cyrene, serving as co-consecrators. 
He served as Bishop of Strongoli until his death in Apr 1706.

References

External links and additional sources
 (for Chronology of Bishops) 
 (for Chronology of Bishops) 

17th-century Italian Roman Catholic bishops
18th-century Italian Roman Catholic bishops
Bishops appointed by Pope Innocent XII
1641 births
1706 deaths